Robert Gabriel Neagu (born 20 July 1991) is a Romanian rugby union football player. He plays mostly as a wing for professional SuperLiga club Steaua București but he can also play as a fullback. He also plays for Romania's national team, the Oaks, making his international debut during the second week of the 2014 end-of-year rugby union internationals in a match against the American Eagles.

Career
Before joining Steaua București, Robert Neagu played for Farul Constanța and Politehnica Iași.

References

External links

1991 births
Living people
Sportspeople from Bârlad
Romanian rugby union players
Romania international rugby union players
București Wolves players
CS Politehnica Iași (rugby union) players
RCJ Farul Constanța players
CSA Steaua București (rugby union) players
Rugby union wings
Rugby union fullbacks